The scaled woodcreeper (Lepidocolaptes squamatus) is a species of bird in the subfamily Dendrocolaptinae. It is endemic to Brazil.

Its natural habitats are subtropical or tropical moist lowland forest and subtropical or tropical moist montane forest.

References

scaled woodcreeper
Birds of the Atlantic Forest
Endemic birds of Brazil
scaled woodcreeper
Taxonomy articles created by Polbot